The 2013–14 Senior Women's National Football Championship was 20th edition of Senior Women's National Football Championship, the women's state competition in Indian football. The tournament will begin from 27 April till 11 May 2014 in the districts of Dibrugarh and Golaghat in Assam.

Twenty states have been divided into four groups of five with defending champions Odisha in Group B along with Karnataka, Goa, Mizoram, and Gujarat. The most accomplished side in the Tournament Manipur have been clubbed in Group A along with Railways, Chhattisgarh, Uttar Pradesh and Maharashtra. In Group C two-time Champions West Bengal have been pitted against Delhi, Kerala, Bihar, Tripura while Group D comprises Jharkhand, Assam, Puducherry, Tamil Nadu, and Uttarakhand.

In the finals played at Golaghat Stadium, Golaghat, Assam. Manipur defeated defending champion Odisha 3–1 to clinch the 20th senior National women’s football championship title, it was 17th crown overall for Manipur.

Group stage

Group A

Group B

Group C

Group D

Semi-finals

Final

References

2014 in Indian women's sport
2014 domestic association football cups
Senior Women's National Football Championship